Hualien earthquake may refer to:
 1966 Hualien earthquake
 2009 Hualien earthquake
 2018 Hualien earthquake
 2019 Hualien earthquake